Upper Saranac Lake is one of three connected lakes, part of the Saranac River, in the towns of Santa Clara and Harrietstown, near the village of Saranac Lake in the Adirondacks in northern New York. Upper Saranac Lake is the sixth largest lake in the Adirondacks.  With Middle Saranac Lake and Lower Saranac Lake, a  paddle with only one carry is possible. There are 20 primitive campsites accessible by boat available on a first-come basis. Upper Saranac Lake is also known as Sin-ha-lo-nen-ne-pus.

The 37 miles of shoreline is 54 percent privately owned, and much of it is lined with "camps", ranging from true Great Camps to small weekend cottages. The lake, along with both Middle and Lower Saranac Lakes, is also part of the 740-mile Northern Forest Canoe Trail, which begins in Old Forge, NY and ends in Fort Kent, ME.

History
The earliest settlement on the lake was built at the south end to serve sportsmen: the Rustic Lodge, built by Jessie Corey on Indian Carry, about 1850, was a simple hostelry offering room, board, and guides for hunting and fishing. Bartlett's, built soon after at the site of Bartlett Carry was similar. Bartlett's Carry enabled sportsmen to get from the Upper to the Middle Saranac Lake, while the Indian Carry crossed from Upper Saranac Lake to Stony Creek Ponds and onto the Raquette River.

Guests could choose between luxurious hotel rooms, cottages or carpeted platform tents along the shore. Despite its scenic location and lavish appointments, it closed in 1914, a victim of high operating costs and a trend toward shorter hotel stays and increasing private camp and cottage ownership. It was demolished for salvage. In 1922, a much smaller hotel was built on the site which operated until just after the 1980 Winter Olympics. A third hotel complex was established using the buildings of the Great Camp adjacent to the hotel property; it is no longer open to the public, and the buildings, designed by William L. Coulter, have been torn down.

The northern end of the lake was the site of the Saranac Inn, built in 1864, continued in operation until 1962; it burned in 1978. At its peak, it accommodated up to a thousand guests, and was frequented by US Presidents Grover Cleveland and Chester A. Arthur, and New York Governor Charles Evans Hughes.

Camp Eagle Island was a Great Camp built in 1899 as a summer retreat for New York Governor and United States Vice-President Levi Morton, designed by noted architect William L. Coulter. The mainland camp, now known as Pine Brook, was originally a part of the Morton camp. Camp Eagle Island was a Girl Scout camp from 1938 to 2008. Camp Eagle Island was included in a multiple property submission for listing on the National Register of Historic Places in 1986, was listed there in 1987, and was named a National Historic Landmark in 2004. The camp property, including Eagle Island, two smaller islands, and a staging area on Gilpin Bay Road on the mainland, was purchased on November 6, 2015 by The Friends of Eagle Island, Inc. (now Eagle Island, Inc.), which now operates the property as a youth camp.

Moss Ledge and Prospect Point Camp are two other Great Camps on the lake designed by William L. Coulter. In the 1940s, the latter was sold, and had a brief career as a lodge, Sekon in the Pines.  It was sold again in 1951, and used as a summer camp for young Jewish girls.  In 1969, it was purchased by Young Life, a Christian non-denominational ministry based in Colorado Springs, Colorado, who use it for one-week-long educational camping sessions.

The cottages that grew up around Saranac Inn (the first dozen were built by the Inn owners) still exist, as do some of the Great Camps built in the area. World War I, the Great Depression and the Income Tax combined to put an end to the Great Camp era, however; many were abandoned and lost for unpaid taxes, burned or left to crumble.

See also
Saranac Inn
Lower Saranac Lake
Middle Saranac Lake
Northern Forest Canoe Trail
Adirondacks

References

Sources
Jamieson, Paul and Morris, Donald, Adirondack Canoe Waters, North Flow, Lake George, NY: Adirondack Mountain Club, 1987.  .
Tolles, Bryant F., Jr., Resort Hotels of the Adirondacks, Lebanon NH: University Press of New England, 2003. .

External links
New York State DEC - Camping Information
Historic Saranac Lake - Upper Saranac Lake
New York Times, "SUNSHINE AND PICNICS; A Combination Saranac Sojourners are Playing to the Limit", August 5, 1906
New York Times, "DEVOTEES OF TENT LIFE.; Enjoying the Fresh Air in the Adirondack Mountains", August 12, 1906

Adirondack Great Camps
Adirondacks
Lakes of New York (state)
Lakes of Franklin County, New York
Tourist attractions in Franklin County, New York
Northern Forest Canoe Trail
Saranac Lake, New York